OFK Bečej 1918 is a football club based in Bečej, Vojvodina, Serbia. They compete in the Serbian League Vojvodina, the third tier of the national league system.

History
After winning the Vojvodina League in the 1988–89 season, the club spent two years in the Yugoslav Inter-Republic League (Group North). They ended up as runners-up in 1989–90, before placing first in 1990–91 to earn promotion to the Yugoslav Second League. The club subsequently finished as champions in the competition's final edition before the breakup of Yugoslavia, getting promotion to the top flight for the first time ever.

Between 1992 and 1998, the club competed in the newly formed First League of FR Yugoslavia. They placed fourth in the 1994–95 season and secured a spot in the 1995 UEFA Intertoto Cup. The club would finish fourth out of five teams in Group 8, recording one win and three losses. They repeated their fourth-place finish in the following 1995–96, this time earning a spot in the 1996–97 UEFA Cup. However, the club was eliminated by Slovenian side Mura in the preliminary round (2–0 on aggregate).

From 1998 to 2004, the club played in the Second League of FR Yugoslavia/Serbia and Montenegro. They spent their first season in Group East and the next five in Group North, before suffering relegation to the Serbian League Vojvodina. After spending three seasons in the third tier, the club was relegated to the Vojvodina League West in 2007.

In December 2011, it was announced that the club would change its name to OFK Bečej 1918, effective from the 2012–13 season. They later won the Vojvodina League North in 2016–17 and subsequently the Serbian League Vojvodina in 2017–18 to reach the Serbian First League, the second tier of the national league pyramid. In December 2018, the club marked its 100th anniversary.

Honours
Yugoslav Second League (Tier 2)
 1991–92
Yugoslav Inter-Republic League / Serbian League Vojvodina (Tier 3)
 1990–91 (Group North) / 2017–18
Vojvodina League / Vojvodina League North (Tier 4)
 1988–89 / 2016–17

European record

Notable players
This is a list of players who have played at full international level.
  Siniša Mulina
  Vladan Vićević
  Zsombor Kerekes
  Kosta Aleksić
  Dimitrije Injac
  Radovan Krivokapić
For a list of all OFK Bečej 1918 players with a Wikipedia article, see :Category:OFK Bečej 1918 players.

Managerial history

References

External links
 Club page at Srbijasport

1918 establishments in Serbia
Association football clubs established in 1918
Football clubs in Yugoslavia
Football clubs in Serbia
Football clubs in Vojvodina
Bečej